The CTO Forum is an IT magazine for India CTO community published fortnightly by 9.9 Media. It is targeted at technology professionals in enterprises. The company, 9.9 Media, also holds a well-known event called The CTO Forum, a summit.

The magazine was started by the Jasubhai Group in 2005.

References

External links
 Official website

2005 establishments in Maharashtra
9.9 Media Products
English-language magazines published in India
Biweekly magazines published in India
Science and technology magazines published in India
Magazines established in 2005
Mass media in Mumbai